Elia Kawika David Kuualoha Kapahulehua (July 13, 1930 – May 17, 2007) was a Hawaiian sailor who was the first to captain an ocean-voyaging canoe from Hawaii to Tahiti in modern times.

Background
Kapahulehua was born on Niihau, in 1930 and picked up the name "Kawika" as a young adult crewing catamarans on Waikiki Beach.

Major accomplishments
The famed 1976 voyage of the Hōkūleʻa was beset with problems, but ultimately successful. While navigator Mau Piailug guided the ship, Kapahulehua had to deal with 6 of 17 crew members who quit their duties at sea. 

A 1978 attempt in which he did not participate capsized after six hours and led to the death of surfer Eddie Aikau.

Later life
In later life, he taught the Hawaiian language, wrote vocabulary books, and officiated at traditional Hawaiian rites. Kapahulehua died in Honolulu, Hawaii.

References

External links
Polynesian Voyaging Society

1930 births
2007 deaths
Hōkūleʻa
People from Niihau
Polynesian navigators